The 2001 Tro-Bro Léon was the 18th edition of the Tro-Bro Léon cycle race and was held on 3 June 2001. The race was won by Jacky Durand.

General classification

References

2001
2001 in road cycling
2001 in French sport